Columns II: The Voyage Through Time (erroneously labeled as A Voyage Through Time on the Switch release) is a 1990 puzzle video game released by Sega, as the sequel to Columns. It was released in Japan for the Sega System C. A port was included in the compilation Sega Ages: Columns Arcade Collection released for the Sega Saturn in Japan in 1997. Columns III however, would be released in North America on the Sega Genesis. The game saw an international release through the Sega Ages line on Nintendo Switch.

Gameplay
The game play is standard Columns fare, match at least three jewels to eliminate them. Once you fill your board to the top you lose. However the objects you destroy aren't always jewels. Because you go "Through Time" the objects that you destroy can vary from fossils to futuristic disks. Other than an interesting sprite swap the "Through Time" idea doesn't actually affect the game play.
 
Columns II has two modes, Flash Columns, and Vs Columns (eventually renamed Stack Columns). In Flash Columns the goal is to eliminate the flashing jewels, disks, or fossils that are in each stage. In order to reach the flashing objects the player must dig their way through the objects that cover it. After all of the flashing objects are eliminated the player advances to the next, usually faster level. Every three levels there is a bonus stage in which the player is able to earn some bonus points. While Columns for the Sega Genesis was the first appearance of Flash Columns, Columns 2 was its first appearance in the arcades.

Vs Columns is much more similar to the original Columns where you build up combos and clear them rather than digging through jewels to get to a certain gem. However, Vs Columns has a competitive twist which is very similar to the Puyo Puyo series. In this mode, both players are given the same gems and have to build up combos against each other. The bigger the combo, the higher your opponent's board is raised until the other player's board is filled to the brim. This is the first appearance of Vs Columns; this mode has been put in almost all later versions of Columns and has become a fan favorite.

Ports
The game was later ported to Nintendo Switch as part of the Switch Sega Ages line. It also marked the first time in nearly 30 years that the game was released in Western territories.

Reception 

In Japan, Game Machine listed Columns II on their November 1, 1990 issue as being the second most-successful table arcade unit of the month. It went on to be Japan's eighth highest-grossing arcade conversion kit of 1991.

References

External links
Columns II at Arcade-History.com

1990 video games
Arcade video games
Puzzle video games
Sega video games
Sega Saturn games
Video games scored by Takayuki Nakamura
Video games developed in Japan